The Israeli Artillery Corps (Heil HaTothanim) is the Israel Defense Forces corps responsible for operating medium and long-range artillery. The current commander of the Artillery Corps is Brigadier General Neri Horowitz. He replaced Brig. Gen. Aviram Sela.

The corps is tasked with two principal missions:
 Assisting IDF maneuvering forces, at the place, time and with the firepower required.
 Paralyzing and destroying enemy targets throughout the IDF zone of operations.

Structure 
The Artillery Corps is an integral corps of GOC Army Headquarters.
It is a diverse corps, with its lion share consisting of high-trajectory barrel artillery. The corps consist of three main support regiments:
 214th "David's Sling" Artillery Regiment, UAV training unit
 215th "Pillar of Fire" Artillery Regiment, composed of the regular-service battalions Drakon ("Dragon") and Reshef ("Flash") as well as reserve battalions.
 282nd "Golan" Artillery Regiment, composed of the regular Namer ("Leopard") and Keren ("Ray") battalions, the Ra'am ("Thunder") MLRS battalion, as well as additional reserve battalions.
 425th "Fire Flame" Artillery Regiment, artillery training unit

The corps also operates the Field Artillery School and a training center.
The corps' importance to the IDF is growing due to the rapid evolution of modern technology. The corps is amongst the most advanced components of the IDF, using advanced technology to improve its precision and effectiveness. During the Second Lebanon War the Israeli Artillery Corps was second only to the Israeli Air Force in the firepower it expended.

Artillery Corps soldiers wear Turquoise berets and black army boots.

Reserve units 
 209th "Kadion" (Reserve) Artillery Regiment
 213th "Revival" (Reserve) Artillery Regiment
 454th "Tabor" (Reserve) Artillery Regiment
 738th (Reserve) Artillery Regiment

Equipment 

The primary equipment used in most regular and reserve batteries is the M109 "Doher" (Galloper) self-propelled howitzer. To assist with ammunition carriage and transport, regular batteries use the M548, a modified version of the M113 carrier, nicknamed "Alpha". In addition, batteries also use Humvees and M113 carriers.

Also in service is the M270 MLRS multiple rocket launcher, the Spike NLOS missile system mounted on M113 chassis for precision strike, as well as the Elbit Hermes 450 and IAI Sky Rider UAVs for artillery spotting. On order are the IMI Lynx and IAI JUMPER multiple rocket launchers to bolster its strike capability against enemy positions and rocket-launching cells.

In addition, the corps also possesses radar and navigation system, some of which are classified.

In 1977, the IDF began developing another self-propelled howitzer, the "Sholef" (Gun-slinger), based on the M109 with a Merkava chassis. The main advantage of the "Sholef" was its self-loading ability, which reduced the number of crewmen from 7 to 4. The project was completed but the IDF decided not to mass-produce the "Sholef" because of its high cost, preferring to purchase the M270 MLRS multiple rocket launcher instead. Its main focus switched to improving the precision systems of the "Doher". The "Sholef" was used operationally only once, in 1990.

In 2010, Israel began an overhaul of the Artillery Corps, based on lessons from the 2006 Lebanon War. The Artillery Corps is being upgraded with new, indigenously produced self-propelled cannons, rockets, missiles produced by Israel's defense industries, which will replace older equipment, as well as state-of-the-art command, control, computers, and communications. Its operational role now reflects a new concept in which artillery is seen as an equal part of the combat force rather than a support element.

Training 
The Israeli Artillery Corps holds its basic training, commanders course and officers school at the Field Artillery School (Bislat), better known as Shivta, after the ancient Nabataean town of the same name.

New recruits go through four months of basic training, in which they learn basic infantry weaponry and drills, as well as basic theoretical artillery training. At the end of the basic training stage, the recruits receive their Turquoise berets, symbolizing their acceptance into the corps. They then advance to an additional four months of advanced training, throughout which they participate in IDF operations. After completing their training, soldiers either join operational batteries or advance to the commanders course, for an additional four months of training.

Notable alumni 
 Dan Harel
 Danny Robas
 Yuval Banay
 Shlomo Artzi
 Yair Nitzani
 Amos Lapidot

References 

Corps of Israel
Artillery administrative corps
Military units and formations established in 1948